Anna and the Moods is a 2006 computer animated short film by the Icelandic digital design and animation company CAOZ in Reykjavík. The plot centers on a girl named Anna Young who contracts a horrible illness that makes her incredibly moody.

The film was written by Academy Award-nominated writer Sjón on a commission by the Brodsky Quartet, which performs the music composed by Julian Nott in the film. It premiered at the 2006 Reykjavík International Film Festival, and was released in Iceland on February 9, 2007 in both Icelandic and English. Anna and the Moods won the Edda Award for Best Short Film.

Plot 
Anna Young has always been the perfect daughter. One day, Anna's attitude dramatically changes, leaving her parents worried. Unable to figure out what has happened to their daughter, Anna's parents take her to Dr. Artmann's clinic for unruly children. At the clinic Anna is exposed to a variety of obstacles in a complex labyrinth. The only way out of the maze for Anna is to complete the tasks in the right way. Anna, however, decides to create mischief to escape. This leads Dr. Artmann to come to a shocking conclusion about Anna, the cure of which is a nasty surprise for her parents.

Cast 

 Terry Jones, narrator
 Björk as Anna Young
 Damon Albarn as Mr. Young
 Thorunn Larusdottir as Mrs. Young
 Sjón as Dr. Artmann
 Jón Páll Eyjólfsson as Granny, Anna's Uncle, Hunter, Michael, MUM figure
 Hreidar Smárason as Little Brother
 Martin Regal as Normal Boy
 Ámundi Sigurdsson as Healthy Boy
 Einar Örn Benediktsson as Peter the Goth
 Stefán Karl Stefánsson, special ad lib and extras

References

External links

2006 films
CAOZ films
Icelandic animated short films
British animated short films
2006 computer-animated films
Computer-animated short films
2000s British films